Nalini Ambady (March 20, 1959 – October 28, 2013) was an Indian-American social psychologist and a leading expert on nonverbal behavior and interpersonal perception. She was born in Calcutta, India and earned her bachelor’s degree at Lady Shri Ram College for women, Delhi University. She furthered her education by moving to the United States for her master’s degree in psychology, from the College of William and Mary, and later received her PhD in social psychology from Harvard. While completing her research at Harvard, she met her husband Raj Marphatia, who was studying at Harvard Law school.

After completing her PhD in 1991, she quickly entered the ranks of academia by accepting a position as an assistant professor at the college of the Holy Cross; she become an associate professor at Tufts University. Ambady later joined the Stanford faculty in 2011, becoming the first individual of Indian origin to teach in Stanford’s department of Psychology. Most notably in her academic career she introduced and conducted extensive research around the concept of thin slice judgments. While teaching at Stanford she founded the SPARQ center and worked to build it until her death in 2013 from leukemia. Her death sparked campaigns to increase the number of South-Asian bone marrow registries globally.

Early life and education
A native of the state of Kerala, India, Ambady did her schooling at the Lawrence School, Lovedale, and joined college at the Lady Shri Ram College for Women, Delhi. Subsequently, she moved to the United States for higher education, completing her M.A. in Psychology from the College of William & Mary, Virginia. She earned her Ph.D. in social psychology from Harvard University in 1991 under the guidance of Robert Rosenthal, with whom she researched thin slice judgments.

Academic career
She held academic positions at Harvard University, Cambridge and the College of the Holy Cross, Massachusetts before being appointed as Professor in the Department of Psychology at Tufts University in 2004. She subsequently moved to Stanford University, California in 2011. She was the first Indian-American woman to teach psychology at Harvard, Tufts, and Stanford.

Ambady specialized in the study of intuition. Her research found that humans perceive nonverbal cues in response to novel people or situations and that the information gleaned from an instant impression is often as powerful as information gleaned by getting to know a situation or person over a longer period of time. She and Robert Rosenthal coined the term "thin slices" to refer to such instantaneous non-verbal cues. Later, author Malcolm Gladwell referred extensively to Ambady's work in his popular book, Blink: The Power of Thinking Without Thinking.

One of Ambady's more well-known experiments asked students to watch silent 10-second videos of unfamiliar professors as they taught, and to rate the professors for likability, honesty, competence, and other qualities. The students' responses correlated remarkably well with similar ratings by students who had spent a full semester getting to know the professors' personalities and teaching qualities.

Founding of SPARQ
During Ambady's appointment at Stanford, she founded SPARQ, the Center for Social Psychological Answers to Real-World Questions. The center was initially called "The Lewin Center", after social psychology pioneer Kurt Lewin. SPARQ officially opened its doors in 2014 after the passing of Ambady, however, she remained active in its formation even during her struggle with leukemia, and until her death. The main goal of SPARQ is to improve society by taking knowledge from the field of social psychology directly to policymakers, teachers and other impactful societal figures. SPARQ is an attempt to address the gap between psychology and the real world and aims to build a bridge between the hands-on experiences of practitioners in the field, and the scientific findings of the lab. SPARQ attempts to accomplish this goal through the fostering of meaningful collaborations between practitioners and social psychologies to the benefit of both.

Illness and death
Ambady was diagnosed with leukemia in May 2004 but recovered after treatment. In 2011, the cancer recurred in a more aggressive form. Her friends and family led an intensive worldwide campaign to find a compatible bone-marrow donor since they were unable to successfully locate any in existing bone-marrow registries. This was partly due to the low numbers of Indians on such registries worldwide and a limited base of donors numbering around 25,000 in the few Indian registries that exist. Her plight sparked a global effort to increase participation in bone marrow registries among South Asian ethnic groups. Though as many as thirteen potential donors were located over a period of time, many of them refused to go through with the transplant process after identification.

Ambady died on October 28, 2013 at Brigham and Women's Hospital in Boston.

Research

Culture and neural activation 
Nalini Ambady and Jamshed Bharucha produced a study published in the journal Current Directions in Psychological Science in 2009 that focused on articles regarding how culture can affect neural activation. They suggest a framework for cultural neuroscience in which both features are objective: culture mapping and source analysis.

Moreover, Ambady discusses source analysis as the process of defining the source or causes of culture mappings. She explains three sources of cultural universals and differences:

 Genetic commonality or difference.

Behavioural genetics studies examining the functional role of 5-HTT have recognized individuals carrying the short allele seem prone to higher levels of anxiety and depression compared to long allele carriers. In addition, individuals with the short allele showed greater amygdala activation, during an emotion-matching task relative to individuals with the long allele.

 Cultural learning and exposure meditated by brain plasticity.

The evidence shows how cultural learning originates from inspecting neural processing in bilinguals and learners of a second language. A study included in the article compared Korean adults who were adopted by French families before the age of 8. The results demonstrate how Korean-born subjects did not remember their native languages and were fluent in French. However, both groups demonstrated parallel patterns of activation to sentences spoken in French, Korean or other foreign languages, implying that proficiency in the language of the new culture was connected with neural changes.

 Similarity or difference explains the difference in stimuli and pattern structures across cultures.

In a meta-analysis comparison, the neuroimaging results for word reading across different languages and cultures found one common area of dispensation across language and cultures. They proposed the existence of a visual word form area in the left mid fusiform gyrus, which seems to be central to word recognition. They also found culture and language-specific patterns of activation. This was through the example of the Chinese writing system which, for example, requires more activation in the visual areas in both hemispheres than do western alphabets.

Racial bias and stereotyping

Race salience and essentialist thinking in racial stereotype development

Nalini Ambady conducted a vast number of research to understand how and why individuals develop racial biases and why they stereotype others.

Published in the journal Child Development in 2010, Nalini Ambady, Kristin Pauker, and Evan P. Apfelbaum, collaborated on a research study that investigated the arrival and the background of racial stereotyping by studying 89 children between the ages of 3 and 10. For the study, the children had to complete a variety of tasks related to matching and sorting. These tasks were used as a measure to assess the children’s knowledge and how they apply positive and negative stereotypes when encountered with in-groups and out-groups. The results from those tasks implied that children start to use stereotypes on out-groups when they are around 6 years old. This could occur based on a number of factors, but this study showed that there were 2 predictors that played an important contribution to the use of these stereotypes. The first predictor was race salience, which is where one sees and then organizes those people by race. The second predictor is essentialist thinking, which is where one believes that a certain race cannot change. These two predictors showed when and how these racial stereotypes may be taking place in real-life situations.

Stereotype susceptibility in children: Effects of identity activation on quantitative performance

Nalini Ambady, Margaret Shih, Amy Kim, and Todd L. Pittinsky worked together on a research study that examined the impact of positive and negative stereotypes had on cognitive performance and shared their findings in the journal Psychological Science in 2001. They accomplished this using two studies which consisted of three separate age groups of children. The first group was between the grade of kindergarten to grade 2 (lower elementary grades). The second group was between the grade of grade 3 and grade 5 (upper elementary grades). The third group was between the grades of grade 6 and grade 8 (middle school). The study showed results of children in lower elementary grades and middle school grades having shifts in their performance based on the positive and negative stereotypes. These findings were also consistent with the adult findings. The stereotypes were subtle and resulted in negative stereotypes impeding one’s performance and positive stereotypes facilitating one’s performance. Stereotype susceptibility development is a critical area and is a necessity to be able to understand the connections between an individual’s behavior and stereotypes.

In a different study conducted by Ambady and her colleagues, she looked at the effects of stereotype saliency on the performance of minorities, specifically in this case Asian Women. Because of the different stereotypes associated with the identities of Asian women; Ambady hypothesized that by making one identity salient, in this case, either gender or race, it would impact the women's performance because it would make different stereotypes salient. What Ambady found was, the women who had their gender made salient, performed poorly on mathematical tasks when compared to control. This was in-line with the stereotype that women are less proficient in math. When the women had their Asian identities made salient, their performance improved relative to control, reflecting the stereotype of Asians being "good at math". These findings were significant as they showed a causal link between stereotype saliency and one's performance, which has real-world impacts.

Nonverbal behavior

Nonverbal communication and psychology: Past and future
Ambady and Marvin A. Hecht investigated the relationship between the study of nonverbal communication and psychology in their 1999 article published in the New Jersey Journal of Communication. The study of nonverbal communication was invented in the 1950s primarily as a cross-disciplinary effort on the part of the psychiatrists, linguists and anthropologists. This was surveyed in the 1960s and 1970s by an explosion of empirical research, books, and popular media attention. However, in the 1908s psychologists began to frequently integrate nonverbal communication variables into new research. Attention to nonverbal cues waned as the cognitive revolution gained momentum. In this generation, there is a renaissance of awareness in nonverbal communication, particularly among those who study emotion, psychophysiology and person perception. Consequently, the future of nonverbal communication may lie where it started; as an interdisciplinary venture.

"Unspoken cultural influence: Exposure to and influence of nonverbal bias" 
In a research study published in 2009, Nalini Ambady and Max Weisbuch explored the importance of nonverbal behavior in shaping culture. They used television as a communication medium to investigate the impacts of nonverbal bias on individuals. They discovered that nonverbal bias influenced individuals’ beliefs, attitudes, and behavior. In research constituting 4 studies, they found out that there was a favorable nonverbal attitude towards especially slim female characters in popular TV programs, and exposure to nonverbal bias against heavier women in TV programs influenced the participants’ attitudes about ideal weight. In the last study, they found out that the regional difference in exposure to nonverbal bias accounted for regional variance in unhealthy dieting behavior among female teenagers.

"Misery loves company: When sadness increases the desire for social connectedness"
In an attempt to specify the potential functions of sadness, Heather M. Gray, Keiko Ishii, and Nalini Ambady examined the effects of induced sadness on attention and motivation. Functional theories hold that different emotions elicit different adaptive responses in the mind and body to prepare us for specific events or surrounding environment. Within this study, Nalini Ambady and colleagues draw upon the previous research by Pickett and colleagues based on the existence of social monitoring systems (SMS). Nalini and colleagues conducted three experiments to investigate the effects of sadness on attention motivation: In the 1st experiment, they built upon the previous research showing that individuals concerned with social connectedness, were specifically attuned to the vocal tone of speech as an important nonverbal social cue. Nalini and colleagues discovered that sadness associated with social loss resulted in attentional bias towards vocal tone. In their second study, they found a significant effect of induced sadness on increased and urgent motivations for affiliation with others. In the third and last part of their study, they provided evidence to distinguish the effects of social loss sadness versus status loss sadness. In contrary to hedonic contingency hypothesis, their result showed that sad individuals were selective in their choice of behavior; the results established in the 1st and 2nd parts of the study concerning attentional bias toward vocal tone and increased desire for social affiliation were restricted to sadness precipitated by social loss, whereas sadness as a result of status loss did not have the same effects.

"Thin slices" of behavior 
In collaboration with Kathleen R. Bogart and Michael L. Slepian, Nalini advanced the study of “thin slices” of behavior when researching the ability to precisely recognize characteristic traits people possess along with their individuality. This method establishes a way to predict an individual’s behavior with something as simple as a swift observation of their nonverbal behavior.

With a glimpse of someone’s “thin slices” of behavior, Nalini and her colleagues believed that just by observing nonverbal behavior, one can determine with accuracy to a certain extent, behavioral outcomes influenced by personality disorders (e.g. anxiety, depression etc.); mental states (e.g. suicide); and how an individual adapts to life events. One could even go as far as specific types of life events such as traumatic experience (e.g. divorce, sexual abuse etc.).

There is only one limitation to this method, a clinician’s analysis can falter when presented with a patient suffering from particular clinical disabilities (e.g. movement disorders such as Parkinson’s disease), since healthy nonverbal behavior is impaired or masked by the exhibited symptoms of these disorders. Conventional methods already entail clinicians to observe their patients and make diagnoses through intuition based on the patient’s personality traits and nonverbal behavior. With the added method of “thin-slice” judgment, specialists would have another valuable resource to provide more qualitative assessments of their patients.

Accuracy of prediction

Previously, through a meta-analysis published in 1992,  Nalini and co-author Rober Rosenthal coined the term “thin slices” of expressive behavior as a valid method of predicting human behavior. The results of their findings presents that thin slices provide a 70% accuracy prediction as opposed to the 30% when using other assessment methods.

They provided three explanations as to why this method is so accurate:

 Derivative of ecological approach and social perception.

Emotions such as anger, fear or dominance are easily recognized due to how well they are recognized universally and the important role they play in survival and adaptability. In contrast, non-crucial survival emotions such as humor, are more challenging to detect due to the necessity to identify through inferential processes.

 Truths to stereotypes and their effects on self-fulfilling prophecies.

It is believed that individuals react to stereotype cues, whether they are biological or behavioral. These stereotypes create expectations in others that influence an individual’s behavior toward the target person and/or group. Research has demonstrated how such expectations will affect people’s positive or negative behavior toward targeted individuals. By exhibiting these behaviors toward target individuals, they, in turn, modify their behavior and confirm the previous expectations. This creates an endless loop of self-fulfilling prophecies.

 Evidence based on the disruptive effect of thinking and reasoning.

A reason why evidence drawn from “thin slices” is accurate is due to the fact that the individuals were not exposed to distracting stimuli. Research found that subjects were less accurate in judgement toward other target individuals during face-to-face scenarios in contrast to impressions evaluated from videotaped targeted individuals. This draws upon two types of stimuli, external and internal.

External stimuli refer to verbal components that can be distracting within actual interactions and require cognitive resources to process internally. These internal processes can also be distracting because it requires the function of thinking and reasoning which can overpower and cloud judgment. Thin slices of behavior are "snap" judgments, therefore, bypass all the distracting stimuli, creating a more accurate impression of the targeted individual(s).

Awards and honours
Ambady was a fellow of the American Association for the Advancement of Science, the American Psychological Association, and the Association for Psychological Science.  She won the AAAS Prize for Behavioral Science Research in 1993. She was presented the Carol and Ed Diener Award in Social Psychology in 1999 by the Society for Personality and Social Psychology for substantial contribution to the field. She also received the Presidential Early Career Award for Scientists and Engineers from President Bill Clinton.

Books
R. B. Adams,M.kotag Jr., N. Ambady, K. Nakayama. and S. Shimojo. (2010).  Social Vision, Oxford University Press.
N. Ambady & J. Skowronski (Eds.) (2008).  First Impressions, Guilford.
M. Weisbuch & N. Ambady.  Shared Minds in Motion: Dynamic Nonverbal Behavior and Social Influence. Psychology Press: Taylor & Francis.

See also
Thin-slicing
Cross-race effect
Neuroculture
Perceptions of sexual orientation

References

External links
Homepage on Stanford University website
Professional Profile
Lab Webpage
Help Nalini Bone Marrow Site 
SPARQ website

1959 births
2013 deaths
Deaths from leukemia
Deaths from cancer in Massachusetts
American people of Indian descent
American Hindus
American people of Malayali descent

Tufts University faculty
Stanford University Department of Psychology faculty
Harvard Graduate School of Arts and Sciences alumni
College of William & Mary alumni
Lady Shri Ram College alumni

American social psychologists
Asian-American women psychologists
Indian psychologists
Indian women psychologists
Scientists from Kolkata
Women scientists from Kerala
Scientists from Kerala
Indian women social scientists
20th-century Indian social scientists
21st-century Indian social scientists
20th-century Indian women scientists
21st-century Indian women scientists

Psychology educators
Educators from Kerala
Women educators from Kerala